Currambine is a northern suburb of Perth, the capital city of Western Australia, 29 km north of Perth's central business district. Its local government area is the City of Joondalup. It contains the Currambine Central shopping centre and cinema complex.

History
Currambine was approved as a suburb name in 1980. The name was chosen by the City of Wanneroo in 1979 from a book by A.W. Reed. It is an Aboriginal word from New South Wales meaning "heaps of rocks".

Currambine was developed as a chiefly residential suburb in the mid-1990s on land adjacent to the Currambine train station, which was built and opened in 1993.

Geography
Currambine is bounded by Burns Beach Road to the north, Marmion Avenue to the west, Shenton Avenue to the south and Mitchell Freeway to the west. The suburb is effectively divided into quarters by the dual carriageways Connolly Drive (north-south) and Moore Drive (east-west).

Demographics 
At the 2016 Australian census, Currambine had a population of 6,912 people living in 2,576 dwellings. According to the 2011 census, Currambine's workforce mostly consists of professionals; technicians and trade workers; and clerical and administrative workers.

Facilities
Currambine is a residential suburb, and is served by the Currambine Market Place shopping centre (now renamed Currambine Central) at its southwestern corner.

The southeastern part of the suburb contains 5 holes of the 27-hole Joondalup Golf Course, part of the Joondalup Resort complex based in neighbouring Connolly. The suburb also contains two primary schools, one public (1997 Currambine Primary School) and one private (Francis Jordan Catholic School). The suburb is within Ocean Reef Senior High School's catchment area. A community centre is also available for use, located near Currambine Central.

Transport
Currambine is served by the 460, 461, 470, these three busses run through Shenton Ave 471 and 472 Transperth bus routes from Joondalup, operated by Swan Transit and by the Currambine railway station.

Politics
Currambine is a fairly new suburb and a classic "mortgage belt" suburb which leans towards the Liberal Party in federal elections and the Australian Labor Party in state elections, in line with many northern Perth suburbs. This has changed in recent elections with majority voting for Liberal in the state elections. As Currambine is a part of two state electorates it is represented by both Mark Folkard: Burns Beach and Emily Hamilton: Joondalup, both of which are Labor representatives.

See also
 Currambine railway station

References

Suburbs of Perth, Western Australia
Suburbs in the City of Joondalup